Pengze railway station is a railway station on the Tongling–Jiujiang railway in Pengze County, Jiujiang, Jiangxi, China. Opened on 1 September 2008, it is under the jurisdiction of China Railway Nanchang Group.

References

Railway stations in Jiangxi
Railway stations in China opened in 2008